The 1872 Columbia football team represented Columbia University in the 1872 college football season. They finished with a 1–2–1 record.

Schedule

See also
 List of the first college football game in each US state

References

Columbia
Columbia Lions football seasons
Columbia football